Logan is a neighborhood in the upper North Philadelphia section of the city of Philadelphia, in the U.S. state of Pennsylvania. The majority of the neighborhood falls within the 19141 zip code, but some of it falls within 19140 (Hunting Park ZIP Code). The neighborhood is sometimes confused with the Olney neighborhood of Philadelphia. Olney Avenue extends from both the Olney and Logan neighborhoods of the city. The Olney Transportation Center is located in Logan.

History
The area was once part of the plantation of James Logan, adviser to William Penn, founder of Pennsylvania. Modern transportation formed the community: the Broad Street subway, which opened in 1928, and a thriving network of streetcar and bus routes, allowed development of what was then considered one of the earliest suburban communities in Philadelphia, though the area is considered urban today. The transportation network still provides Logan residents easy access to the rest of the city.

Logan had been a predominantly Jewish neighborhood until the 1970s.  11th Street was a center of commerce with two bakeries, a deli, and a dairy store.  Broad Street had three movie theaters.  In the 1970s, Korean people began moving into Logan and established businesses. By the mid-1980s Koreans began moving out of Logan and into sections such as Olney in Philadelphia, and nearby suburbs such as Cheltenham as the area began to gentrify, as African-Americans and Hispanics, which accompanied the migration of Koreans into the neighborhood from the previous decade, began to populate the area, as Koreans began to migrate out of the Logan section and into the nearby suburbs further from Philadelphia.

In 1980, the Fishers Lane Historic District was created, certifying 12 Second Empire and Italianate architecture style buildings.

Geography
The neighborhood is bordered by the Hunting Park neighborhood to the south, the Feltonville neighborhood to the southeast, the Germantown neighborhood to the west, the Olney neighborhood to the east, the Ogontz/Belfield  neighborhood to the northwest, and the Fern Rock neighborhood to the north.  The terrain is generally flat. Wingohocking Creek flows under Wingohocking Street along Logan's southern border.

Demographics

As of the census of 2010, the racial makeup of Logan is 59.7% African American, 29.1% Hispanic, 5.4% Asian, 3.9% white, and 2% from other races. The neighborhood is mainly made up of African Americans and Puerto Ricans.

The population of Logan decreased by 14% between the 1990 and 2000 censuses, in large part because of the razing of numerous row homes in the Southern portion of the neighborhood, which had sunk into the landfill on which they were built. This area today is known as the "Logan Triangle".

Education

Primary, secondary, and higher education 

Logan is a part of the School District of Philadelphia.

Elementary schools:
 Birney Elementary School
 Jay Cooke Elementary School
 Logan Elementary
 Thurgood Marshall Elementary
 St. Vincent dePaul School

High schools:
 Central High school (a magnet school)
 Philadelphia Girls' High School (a magnet school)
 Widener Memorial School
 Delaware Valley Charter High School (charter)
 Cristo Rey Philadelphia High School (Catholic)

Logan is also home to one college: La Salle University, a private, co-educational, Roman Catholic university founded in 1863 by the Christian Brothers religious order. La Salle is located in the northwestern corner of the neighborhood.

Museums 
The Stenton is the former home of James Logan, colonial Mayor of Philadelphia and Chief Justice of the Pennsylvania Supreme Court. This home has been turned into a house museum.

La Salle University Art Museum is a six gallery museum located on La Salle's campus.

Public libraries
The Free Library of Philadelphia Logan Branch serves Logan. It was built in 1917.

Health care
The principal hospital is Einstein Medical Center Philadelphia, also a significant employer in the region. As of Autumn 2008, Quality Community Health Care has opened the Cooke Family Health Center. CFHC is  open to residents of Logan and the surrounding area located within Jay Cooke Elementary School.

Economy
In the past factories were clustered in a few areas; historically they were diverse, and included Mrs. Smith's Pies on Lindley Avenue and the Fleer Baseball Card Gum Company near 10th Street and Lindley.  Four block commercial districts of retailers and neighborhood businesses stretch along Broad Street and the parallel Old York Road.

Transportation
SEPTA buses , and  run in this neighborhood. Olney Transportation Center is on Olney Avenue in Logan. The Broad Street Line subway also serves Olney Transportation Center. The subway travels from North Philadelphia to Center City and South Philadelphia.

The Logan neighborhood has three stops on the Broad Street Line:
 
Olney Transportation Center (upper/north Logan) - located near Philadelphia High School for Girls, Widener High School, Albert Einstein Medical Center, Central High School, and La Salle University
Logan subway stop (mid-Logan) located near Logan's Branch of the Free Library of Philadelphia, Delaware Valley Charter High School, and Cristo Ray High School
Wyoming subway stop (south Logan) - located near the Stenton Park, Logan Triangle, and Roosevelt Boulevard

Notable residents

 Gerard Ebbecke, Chief Traffic Engineer of Philadelphia until his death in 1998 - resided in Logan in his youth
 David Goodis, author of many noir novels of the 1940s and 50s, including Dark Passage and Shoot the Piano Player
 Lisa "Left Eye" Lopes of TLC

References

 Logan Redevelopment Area Plan. Philadelphia: PA: Philadelphia City Planning Commission, May, 2002.
 1976 Bulletin Almanac. Philadelphia, PA: Evening and Sunday Bulletin, 1976.

External links

 "Logan & Wagner," Ryan Caviglia, New Colonist
 Aerial perspective from Virtual Earth including northern edge of the Logan Redevelopment Area
 Aerial perspective from Virtual Earth of Broad St & Lindley Avenue
 Logan Redevelopment Area Plan

 
Neighborhoods in Philadelphia